Callum Ernest John Irving (born March 16, 1993) is a Canadian professional soccer player who plays as a goalkeeper for Canadian Premier League club Vancouver FC.

He began his career playing for local clubs in Vancouver before joining the Whitecaps FC Academy in 2007. After attending the University of Kentucky, he went undrafted in the 2016 MLS SuperDraft and subsequently joined Rio Grande Valley FC Toros. After a short-term loan spell at Houston Dynamo, Irving joined Ottawa Fury in December 2016.

Irving has won a single cap with the Canadian national team.

Club career

Youth and college
Irving began playing soccer at the age of four and spent 10 years with Marpole SC. He also played for the Vancouver Selects for two seasons, and represented the British Columbia provincial team at U16 level.

In 2007, he joined the Whitecaps FC Academy and appeared for Premier Development League side Vancouver Whitecaps FC U-23 in 2010 and 2011.

Irving played four years of college soccer at the University of Kentucky between 2012 and 2015. In his 2014 season, Irving was named NSCAA Third Team All-America, NSCAA First Team All-Southeast Region, Conference USA Player of the Year, Defensive MVP, Golden Glove and First Team All-Conference USA.

In his 2015 season, Irving was named NSCAA First Team All-America, NSCAA First Team All-Southeast Region and Conference USA Player of the Year, Conference USA Defensive MVP, Golden Glove, First Team All-Conference USA and set a Kentucky Wildcats record with 27 shut-outs.

Rio Grande Valley Toros
On January 13, 2016, Irving signed a contract with Major League Soccer ahead of the 2016 MLS SuperDraft, where he was expected to go early on in the draft. However, Irving wasn't selected by any MLS team over the four rounds. He signed with United Soccer League side Rio Grande Valley FC Toros on March 26.

On May 29, Irving made his debut in a 1–1 draw against Saint Louis FC. He went on to make 14 appearances in his inaugural season, conceding nine goals and keeping eight shutouts.

Houston Dynamo (loan)
On September 16, 2016, Irving was signed on a short-term loan by the Houston Dynamo, an affiliate club of Rio Grande Valley Toros. Injuries to Tyler Deric and Calle Brown meant Irving was called in to act as backup to Joe Willis. On September 17, he was named as an unused substitute in a bloodless 1–0 affair against Real Salt Lake.

Ottawa Fury
On December 6, 2016, Irving joined Ottawa Fury ahead of their first season in the United Soccer League. He made his debut in a 3–2 defeat to Saint Louis FC on April 1, 2017, and went on to play in every minute of Ottawa's 2017 campaign, including all four Canadian Championship games. In doing so, he set a franchise record for consecutive starts. He was named Newcomer of the Year and Supporters Player of the Year at the end of the season after recording eight shutouts during the season.

In November 2017, Irving re-signed with Ottawa for the 2018 season. On April 14, 2018, his streak of consecutive starts came to an end after 38 games when he was named as an unused substitute in a 1–0 defeat to the Pittsburgh Riverhounds. Despite reports that Irving would not return after the 2018 season, it was later reported that he had re-signed for the 2019 season. After three seasons with the Fury, the club would cease operations for the 2020 season, making Irving a free agent.

Pacific FC
On February 19, 2020, Irving signed with Canadian Premier League side Pacific FC. He made his debut for Pacific on August 25, saving a penalty while keeping a clean sheet in a 2–0 victory over Valour FC. After backstopping Pacific to the 2021 CPL Championship, the club announced Irving would be returning to the team for the 2022 season. In December 2022, Pacific announced Irving was departing the club.

Vancouver FC
In December 2022, Irving was announced as Vancouver FC's first ever signing.

International career
Irving has been called for multiple camps with the Canadian U20 national team. In January 2016, Irving earned his first call up to the Canadian national team for a friendly against the United States. He was an unused substitute as Canada suffered a 1–0 defeat. On January 22, 2017, he made his senior international debut in 4–2 win over Bermuda.

Personal life
Born and raised in Vancouver, British Columbia, Canada, Irving attended David Lloyd George Elementary School, Sir Wilfrid Laurier Elementary School and Sir Winston Churchill Secondary School.

Honours

Club
Pacific FC
Canadian Premier League: 2021

Career statistics

References

External links

1993 births
Living people
Association football goalkeepers
Canadian soccer players
Soccer players from Vancouver
Canadian expatriate soccer players
Expatriate soccer players in the United States
Kentucky Wildcats men's soccer players
Vancouver Whitecaps FC U-23 players
Rio Grande Valley FC Toros players
Houston Dynamo FC players
Ottawa Fury FC players
Pacific FC players
USL League Two players
USL Championship players
Canadian Premier League players
All-American men's college soccer players
Canada men's youth international soccer players
Canada men's international soccer players
Vancouver FC players